Christianity is India's third-largest religion with about 27.8 million adherents, making up 2.3 percent of the population as of the 2011 census. The written records of the Saint Thomas Christians state that Christianity was introduced in the Indian subcontinent by Thomas the Apostle, who sailed to the Malabar region in the present-day Kerala state in 52 AD.

The Acts of Thomas mentions that the first converts were Malabarese Jews, who had settled in India before the birth of Christ. Thomas who was a Jew by birth came in search of Indian Jews. Following years of evangelising, Thomas was martyred and his remains were buried at St. Thomas Mount in Mylapore. A scholarly consensus exists that Christian communities had firmly established in the Malabar by 600 AD at the latest. These communities were composed mainly with the Oriental Orthodox Eastern Christians, belonging to the Church of the East in India, that used Syriac as their liturgical language. 

Following the discovery of a sea route to India by the Portuguese explorer Vasco da Gama in the 15th century AD, Western Christianity was established in the European colonies of Goa, Tranquebar, Bombay, Madras, and Pondicherry in the form of Catholicism and Protestantism. Christian missionaries introduced western educational system to the Indian subcontinent to spread Christianity and campaigned for social reforms.

The Church of North India, the Church of Pakistan, and the Church of South India are united Protestant Churches that were established as a result of evangelism and ecumenism by Anglicans, Methodists, and other Protestants in India who flourished in colonial India.

Christians were active in the Indian National Congress and the Indian independence movement. The All India Conference of Indian Christians advocated for swaraj (self rule) and opposed the partition of India. 

Along with native Christians, small Eurasian Christian communities such as Anglo-Indians, Luso-Indians, Armenian Indians, and others had also existed in the subcontinent. There are also reports of a sizable number of crypto-Christians of Hindu, Muslim, Sikh, Jain background living in India in recent years, due to fear of religious persecution.

Early Christianity in India

St. Bartholomew 

Eusebius of Caesarea's Ecclesiastical History (5:10) states that Bartholomew, a disciple of Jesus, went on a missionary tour to India, where he left behind a copy of the Gospel of Matthew. One tradition holds that he preached the Gospel in India, prior to his travels to Armenia, while others hold that Bartholomew travelled as a missionary in Ethiopia, Mesopotamia, Parthia, and Lycaonia.

St. Thomas 

According to the tradition of Saint Thomas Christians, Thomas the Apostle landed in Kodungallur in the present day Indian state of Kerala in AD 52, establishing the Ezharappallikal through the conversion of local Jews and Brahmins to Christianity. After years of evangelization in South India, Saint Thomas was killed at St. Thomas Mount in Chennai in AD 72. The neo-Gothic Cathedral Basilica of San Thome now stands on the site of his martyrdom and burial. A historically more likely claim by Eusebius of Caesarea is that Pantaenus, the head of the Christian exegetical school in Alexandria, Egypt went to India during the reign of the Emperor Commodus and found Christians already living in India using a version of the Gospel of Matthew with "Hebrew letters, a mixture of culture." This is a plausible reference to the earliest Indian churches which are known to have used the Syriac New Testament; Syriac being a dialect of Aramaic. Pantaenus' evidence thus indicates that Syriac-speaking Christians had already evangelised parts of India by the late 2nd century AD. 

Another church tradition concerning the birth of Christ holds that Gaspar, one of the three Biblical Magi, travelled from India to find the Christ child along with Melchior of Persia and Balthazar of Ethiopia.

An early 3rd-century AD Syriac work known as the Acts of Thomas connects the tradition of the Apostle Thomas' Indian ministry with two kings, one in the north and the other in the south. The year of his arrival is widely disputed due to lack of credible records. According to one of the legends in the Acts of Thomas, Thomas was at first reluctant to accept this mission, but Jesus over-ruled him by ordering circumstances so compelling that he was forced to accompany an Indian merchant, Abbanes, to his native place in northwest India, where he found himself in the service of the Indo-Parthian king, Gondophares. The apostle's ministry reputedly resulted in many conversions throughout this northern kingdom, including the king and his brother. The Acts of Thomas identifies his second mission in India with a kingdom ruled by a certain King named Mahadwa belonging to a 1st-century dynasty in southern India.

Niranam Pally also known as St Mary's Orthodox Syrian Church is believed to be one of the oldest churches in India. The church was founded by St. Thomas in AD 54. On his way from Kollam in the northeast direction, he arrived at Niranam "Thrikpapaleswaram" by sea. The church was reconstructed several times with some parts dating back to a reconstruction in 1259. The architecture of the church bears a striking similarity to ancient temple architecture. Another ancient church is St. Thomas Syro-Malabar Church, located at Palayur in Thrissur district in Kerala. According to Saint Thomas christian tradition, the Syrian church was established between 52 and 54 AD by St Thomas, where he performed the first baptism in India. This church is therefore considered an Apostolic See credited to the apostolate of St. Thomas.

Although little is known of the immediate growth of the church in the northwestern regions of India, Bar-Daisan (154–223 AD) reports that in his time there were Christian tribes in North India that claimed to have been converted by Thomas and had books and relics to prove it. It is believed that by the time of the establishment of the Sassanid Empire around 226 AD, there were bishops of the Church of the East in northwest India, Afghanistan and Baluchistan, with laymen and clergy alike engaging in missionary activity. The existence of Early Christians in India is further substantiated by the records acknowledging the work of Saint Severus of Vienne, a 5th-century missionary of Indian origin who evangelised in Vienne, France.

4th century missions 
India had a flourishing trade with Central Asia, the Mediterranean, and the Middle East, both along mountain passes in the north and sea routes down the western and southern coast, well before the advent of the Christian era, and it is likely that Christian merchants from these lands settled in Indian cities along these trading routes. The colony of Syrian Christians established at Muziris present-day Kodungallur may be the first Christian community in South India for which there is a continuous written record.

The Chronicle of Seert describes an evangelical mission to India by Bishop David of Basra around the year 300, who reportedly made many conversions, and it has been speculated that his mission took in areas of southern India.

It was also proposed by one scholar in 1987 that Thomas of Cana, who arrived in the Malabar sometime between the 4th and the 9th century. The community of people that came along with him is called Kanaya Christians.

Medieval period 

The  Saint Thomas Christian community was further strengthened by Christian immigrants from the Middle-East. This also resulted in the establishment of Knanaya colonies in south Kerala during the 4th century. Babylonian Christians settled on the Malabar coast in 4th century AD. Mar Sabor and Mar Proth arrived in the 9th century AD.

Saint Thomas Christians seem to have enjoyed various rights and privileges as well as a high status as recorded on copper plates, also known as Cheppeds, Royal Grants, Sasanam, etc. There are a number of such documents in the possession of the Syrian churches of Kerala which include the Thazhekad Sasanam, the Quilon Plates (or the Tharisappalli Cheppeds), Mampally Sasanam and Iraviikothan Chepped, etc. Some of these plates have been dated to around 774 AD. Scholars have studied the inscriptions and produced varying translations. The language used is Old Malayalam in Vattezhuthu script intermingled with some Grantha, Pahlavi, Kufic and Hebrew scripts. The ruler of Venad (Travancore) granted the Saint Thomas Christians seventy-two rights and privileges which were usually granted only to high dignitaries. These rights included exemption from import duties, sales tax and the slave tax. A copper plate grant dated 1225 AD further enhanced the rights and privileges of Nasranis.

Other references to Saint Thomas Christians include the South Indian epic of Manimekalai, written between 2nd and 3rd century AD, which mentions the Nasrani people by referring to them by the name Essanis. The embassy of King Alfred in 883 AD sent presents to St. Thomas Christians. Marco Polo who visited in 1292, mentioned that there were Christians in the Malabar coast. 

The French or Catalan Dominican missionary Jordanus Catalani was the first Catholic European missionary to arrive in India. He landed in Surat in around 1320. By a separate bull, that reads Venerabili Fratri Jordano, he was appointed the first Bishop of Quilon on 21 August 1329 AD. In 1321, Jordanus Catalani also arrived in Bhatkal, a place near Mangalore, and established a missionary station there converting many locals. He also evangelised in Thana district (Trombay) near Bombay; the descendants of these converts would later become part of the Bombay East Indian community.

Modern period

Portuguese efforts to Catholicize Saint Thomas Christians

Thomas the Apostle is credited by tradition for founding the Indian Church in 52 AD. This church developed contacts with the Church of the East religious authorities based in Edessa, Mesopotamia at the time.

Historically, this community was organised as the Province of India of the Church of the East by Patriarch of Babylon Timothy I (780–823 AD) in the eighth century, served by bishops and a local dynastic archdeacon. In the 14th century, the Church of the East declined due to persecution from Tamerlane. The 16th century witnessed the colonial overtures of the Portuguese Padroado aiming to bring St Thomas Christians into the Latin Catholic Church, administered by the Portuguese Padroado Archdiocese of Goa, leading to the first of several rifts in the community. The efforts of the Portuguese culminated in the Synod of Diamper, formally subjugating them and their whole Archdiocese of Angamaly as a suffragan see to the Archdiocese of Goa administered by Roman Catholic Padroado missionaries.

The death of the last metropolitan bishop – Archbishop Abraham of the Saint Thomas Christians, an ancient body formerly part of the Church of the East in 1597 gave the then Archbishop of Goa Menezes an opportunity to bring the native church under the authority of the Roman Catholic Church. He was able to secure the submission of Archdeacon George, the highest remaining representative of the native church hierarchy. Menezes convened the Synod of Diamper between 20 and 26 June 1599, which introduced a number of reforms to the church and brought it fully into the Latin Rite of the Catholic Church. Following the Synod, Menezes consecrated Francis Ros, S. J. as Archbishop of the Archdiocese of Angamalé for the Saint Thomas Christians; thus created another suffragan see to Archdiocese of Goa and Latinisation of St Thomas Christians started. The Saint Thomas Christians were pressured to acknowledge the authority of the Pope and most of them eventually accepted the Catholic faith, but a part of them switched to West Syriac Rite. Resentment of these measures led to some part of the community to join the Archdeacon, Thomas, in swearing never to submit to the Portuguese Jesuits in the Coonan Cross Oath in 1653. Those who accepted the West Syriac theological and liturgical tradition of Gregorios became known as Jacobites. The others who continued with East Syriac theological and liturgical tradition stayed faithful to the Catholic Church.

Following the synod, the Indian Church was governed by Portuguese prelates. They were generally unwilling to respect the integrity of the local church. This resulted in disaffection which led to a general revolt in 1653 known as the "Coonan Cross Oath". Under the leadership of Archdeacon Thomas, Nazranis around Cochin gathered at Mattancherry church on Friday, 24 January 1653 (M.E. 828 Makaram 3) and made an oath that is known as the Great Oath of Bent Cross. There are various versions about the wording of oath, one version being that the oath was directed against the Portuguese, another that it was directed against Jesuits, yet another version that it was directed against the authority of Church of Rome. Those who were not able to touch the cross tied ropes on the cross, held the rope in their hands and made the oath. Because of the weight it is believed by the followers that the cross bent a little and so it is known as "Oath of the bent cross" (Coonen Kurisu Sathyam). This demanded administrative autonomy for the local church.

A few months, later Archdeacon Thomas was ordained as bishop by twelve priests with the title Thoma I. At this time, Rome intervened and Carmelite Missionaries were sent to win the Thomas Christians back. Carmelites could convince the majority that the local church needs bishops and the consecration of the Archdeacon Thomas was invalid because the consecration was conducted not by a bishop, but by priests. Many leaders of the community rejoined the missionaries. But in 1663, Dutch conquered Cochin supplanting the Portuguese on the Malabar coast. Portuguese Missionaries had to leave the country and they consecrated Palliveettil Chandy kathanaar as the bishop for the Catholic Thomas Christians on 1 February 1663. Meanwhile, Thoma I appealed to several eastern Christian churches for regularizing his consecration. The Syriac Orthodox Patriarch responded and sent metropolitan Gregorios Abdul Jaleel of Jerusalem to India in 1665. He confirmed Thoma I as a bishop and worked together with him to organize the Church. These events led to the gradual and lasting schism among the Saint Thomas Christians of India, leading to the formation of Puthenkūr (New allegiance) and Pazhayakūr (Old allegiance) factions.

The Pazhayakūr comprise the present day Syro-Malabar Church and Chaldean Syrian Church which continue to employ the East Syriac Rite (Babylonian Rite /Persian Rite) liturgy. The Puthenkūr, who entered into a new communion with the Syriac Orthodox Church of Antioch, an Oriental Orthodox church, inherited from them the West Syriac Rite, replacing the old East Syriac Rite liturgy. Puthenkūr is the body from which present day Jacobite Syrian Christian Church, Malankara Orthodox Syrian Church, Mar Thoma Syrian Church, St. Thomas Evangelical Church of India, Syro-Malankara Catholic Church and Malabar Independent Syrian Church originate.

Arrival of Europeans 

In 1453, the fall of Constantinople to Sunni Islamic Ottoman Caliphate marked the end of the Byzantine (Eastern Roman Empire), and severed European trade links by land with Asia. This massive blow to Christendom spurred the age of discovery as Europeans started seeking alternative routes east by sea along with the goal of forging alliances with pre-existing Christian nations. Along with Portuguese long-distance maritime travelers that reached the Malabar Coast in the late 15th century, came Portuguese missionaries who made contact with the St Thomas Christians in Kerala. These Christians were following Eastern Christian practices and under the jurisdiction of Church of the East. The missionaries sought to introduce the Latin liturgical rites among them and unify East Syriac Christians in India under the Holy See. This group, which existed in Kerala relatively peacefully for more than a millennium, faced considerable persecution from Portuguese evangelists in the 16th century. This later wave of evangelism spread Catholicism more widely along the Konkan coast.

The South Indian coastal areas around Kanyakumari were known for pearl fisheries ruled by the Paravars. From 1527, the Paravars, being threatened by Arab fleets offshore who were supported Zamorin of Calicut, sought the protection of the Portuguese who had moved into the area. The protection was granted on the condition that the leaders were immediately baptised as Christians and that they would encourage their people also to convert to Christianity. The Portuguese in turn wanted to gain a strategic foothold and control of the pearl fisheries. The deal was agreed and some months later 20,000 Paravars were baptised en masse, and by 1537 the entire community had declared itself to be Christian. The Portuguese navy destroyed the Arab fleet at Vedalai on 27 June 1538.

Francis Xavier, a Jesuit, began a mission to the lower classes of Tamil society in 1542. A further 30,000 Paravars were baptised.  Xavier appointed catechists in the Paravar villages up and down the  coastline to spread and reinforce his teachings. Paravar Christianity, with its own identity based on a mixture of Christian religious belief and Hindu caste culture, remains a defining part of the Paravar life today.

In the 16th century, the proselytisation of Asia was linked to the Portuguese colonial policy. Missionaries of the different orders including Franciscans, Dominicans, Jesuits, Augustinians arrived with the Portuguese colonisers. The history of Portuguese missionaries in India starts with the Portuguese clergy who reached Kappad near Kozhikode on 20 May 1498, along with the Portuguese explorer Vasco da Gama who was seeking to form anti-Islamic alliances with pre-existing Christian nations. The lucrative spice trade was further temptation for the Portuguese crown. When he and the Portuguese missionaries arrived, they found Christians in the country in Malabar known as St. Thomas Christians who belonged to the then-largest Christian church within India. The Christians were friendly to Portuguese missionaries at first; there was an exchange of gifts between them, and these groups were delighted at their common faith.

During the second expedition, the Portuguese fleet comprising 13 ships and 18 priests, under Captain Pedro Álvares Cabral, anchored at Cochin on 26 November 1500. Cabral soon won the goodwill of the Raja of Cochin. He allowed four priests to do apostolic work among the early Christian communities scattered in and around Cochin. Thus Portuguese missionaries established Portuguese Mission in 1500. Dom Francisco de Almeida, the first Portuguese Viceroy got permission from the Kochi Raja to build two churches – namely Santa Cruz Basilica (1505) and St. Francis Church (1506) using stones and mortar, which was unheard of at that time, as the local prejudices were against such a structure for any purpose other than a royal palace or a temple.

In the beginning of the 16th century, the whole of the east was under the jurisdiction of the Archdiocese of Lisbon. On 12 June 1514, Cochin and Goa became two prominent mission stations under the newly created Diocese of Funchal in Madeira. In 1534, Pope Paul III by the Bull Quequem Reputamus, raised Funchal as an archdiocese and Goa as its suffragan, deputing the whole of India under the diocese of Goa. This created an episcopal see – suffragan to Funchal, with a jurisdiction extending potentially over all past and future conquests from the Cape of Good Hope to China.

The first converts to Christianity in Goa were native Goan women who married Portuguese men that arrived with Afonso de Albuquerque during the Portuguese conquest of Goa in 1510. Due to the Christianisation of Goa, over 90% of the Goans in the Velhas Conquistas became Catholic by the 1700s.

The Portuguese government supported the missionaries. At the same time many New Christians from Portugal emigrated to India as a result of the Portuguese Inquisition. Many of them were suspected of being Crypto-Jews and Crypto-Muslims, converted Jews and Muslims who were secretly practising their old religions. Both were considered a threat to the solidarity of Christian belief. According to Maria Aurora Couto, Jesuit missionary Francis Xavier requested the installation of the Goa Inquisition in a letter dated 16 May 1546 to King John III of Portugal, but the tribunal commenced only in 1560. The Inquisition office persecuted Hindus, Muslims, Bene Israels, New Christians and the Judaizing Nasranis. Crypto-Hindus were the primary target of the 250 years of persecution and punishment for their faith by the Catholic prosecutors. Most affected were the Shudras (12.5%) and farmers (35.5%).

In 1557, Goa was made an independent archbishopric, and its first suffragan sees were erected at Cochin and Malacca. The whole of the East came under the jurisdiction of Goa and its boundaries extended to almost half of the world: from the Cape of Good Hope in South Africa, to Burma, China and Japan in East Asia. In 1576, the suffragan See of Macao (China) was added; and in 1588, that of Funai in Japan. 

The Diocese of Angamaly was transferred to Diocese of Craganore in 1605, while, in 1606 a sixth suffragan see to Goa was established at San Thome, Mylapore, near the modern Madras, and the site of the National Shrine of St. Thomas Basilica. The suffragan sees added later to Goa. were the prelacy of Mozambique (1612), Peking (1609) and Nanking (1609) in China.
A significant portion of the crew on Portuguese ships were Indian Christians.

The Portuguese were however unable to establish their presence in Mangalore as a result of the conquests of the Vijayanagara ruler Krishnadevaraya and Abbakka Rani of Ullal, the Bednore Queen of Mangalore. Most of Mangalorean Catholics were not originally from Mangalore but from Goa, which they fled during the Sackings of Goa and Bombay-Bassein and to escape the persecution of the Goan Inquisition.

The Franciscans spearheaded the evangelisation of the "Province of the North" headquartered at Fort San Sebastian of Bassein (close to present day Mumbai), but the fort's officials were subordinate to the viceroy in the capital of Velha Goa. From 1534 to 1552, a priest by the name António do Porto converted over 10,000 people, built a dozen churches, convents, and a number of orphanages hospitals and seminaries. Prominent among the converts were two yogis from the Kanheri Caves who became known as Paulo Raposo and Francisco de Santa Maria. They introduced Christianity to their fellow yogis, converting many in the process. The descendants of these Christians are today known as the Bombay East Indian Christians who are predominantly Roman Catholics and inhabitants of the north Konkan region.

In Portuguese Bombay and Bassein missionary work progressed on a large scale and with great success along the western coasts, chiefly at Chaul, Bombay, Salsette, Bassein, Damao, and Diu; and on the eastern coasts at San Thome of Mylapore, and as far as Bengal etc. In the southern districts the Jesuit mission in Madura was the most famous. It extended to the Krishna river, with a number of outlying stations beyond it. The mission of Cochin, on the Malabar Coast, was also one of the most fruitful. Several missions were also established in the interior northwards that of Agra and Lahore in 1570 and that of Tibet in 1624. Still, even with these efforts, and many vast tracts of the interior northwards were practically unreached.

With the decline of the Portuguese power, other colonial powers namely the Dutch and British gained influence, paving the way for the arrival of Protestantism.

Arrival of Protestant missions 

Beginning about 1700 Protestant missionaries began working throughout India, leading to the establishment of different Christian communities across the Indian Subcontinent.

German Lutherans and Basel mission
The first Protestant missionaries to set foot in India were two Lutherans from Germany, Bartholomäus Ziegenbalg and Heinrich Plütschau, who began work in 1705 in the Danish settlement of Tranquebar. They translated the Bible into the local Tamil language, and afterwards into Hindustani. They made little progress at first, but gradually the mission spread to Madras, Cuddalore and Tanjore. The Bishop of Tranquebar is still the official title of the bishop of the Tamil Evangelical Lutheran Church in Tamil Nadu which was founded in 1919 as a result of the German Lutheran Leipzig Mission and Church of Sweden Mission, the successors of Bartholomäus Ziegenbalg and Heinrich Plütschau. The seat of the bishop, the cathedral and its church house, the Tranquebar House are in Tiruchirappalli.

German missionary Johann Phillip Fabricius, who arrived in South India in 1740,  published the first Tamil to English dictionary and refined the Tamil Bible translation.

Christian Friedrich Schwarz was a prominent German Lutheran missionary who arrived in India in 1750. His mission was instrumental in the conversion of many people from Tamil Nadu to Lutheranism. He died in Tamil Nadu and was buried in St.Peter's Church at Thanjavur, Tamil Nadu.

Hermann Gundert a German missionary, scholar, and linguist, as well as the maternal grandfather of German novelist and Nobel laureate Hermann Hesse was a missionary in the South Indian state of Kerala and was instrumental in compiling a Malayalam grammar book, Malayalabhaasha Vyakaranam (1859), in which he developed and constructed the grammar currently spoken by the Malayalis, published a Malayalam-English dictionary (1872), and contributed to work on Bible translations into Malayalam.

Eugen Liebendörfer was the first German missionary doctor in India as part of the Basel Mission. He built hospitals in Kerala and Karnataka.

Another Basel Missionary Ferdinand Kittel  worked in South Indian state of Karnataka in places such as Mangalore, Madikeri and Dharwad in Karnataka. He is renowned for his studies of the Kannada language and for producing a Kannada-English dictionary of about 70,000 words in 1894. He also composed numerous Kannada poems.

Hermann Mögling was a German missionary to Karnataka, he is credited as the publisher of the first ever newspaper in the Kannada language called as Mangalooru Samachara in 1843. He was awarded a doctorate for his literary work in Kannada called as Bibliotheca Carnataca. He also translated Kannada literature into German.

Another Lutheran German missionary to South Indian state of Kerala was Volbrecht Nagel, he was a missionary to the Malabar coast of India. Initially associated with the Evangelical Lutheran Church, he later joined the Open Brethren, and is remembered now as a pioneer of the Kerala Brethren movement.

William Carey and the Baptists

In 1793, William Carey, an English Baptist Minister, came to India as a missionary but also as a man of learning in economics, medicine and botany. He worked in Serampore, Calcutta, and other places. He translated the Bible into Bengali, Sanskrit, and numerous other languages and dialects.  He worked in India despite the hostility of the British East India Company until his death in 1834. Carey and his colleagues, Joshua Marshman and William Ward, blended science, Christianity, and constructive Orientalism in their work at the Danish settlement of Serampore, near Calcutta. Carey saw the dissemination of European science and Christianity as mutually supportive and equally important civilizing missions. He also supported a revival of Sanskrit science. Carey played a key role in the establishment of the Agricultural Society of India. Ward, beginning in 1806, published important commentaries on ancient Hindu medical and astronomy texts. In 1818 Carey and his fellow missionaries founded Serampore College to nurture a uniquely Indian variety of European science.

Other missions
The London Missionary Society was the first Protestant mission in Andhra Pradesh which established its station at Visakhapatnam in 1805. Anthony Norris Groves, a Plymouth Brethren missionary arrived in 1833. He worked in the Godavari delta area until his death in 1852. John Christian Frederick Heyer was the first Lutheran missionary in the region of Andhra Pradesh. He founded the Guntur Mission in 1842. Supported initially by the Pennsylvania Ministerium, and later by the Foreign Mission Board of the General Synod, Heyer was also encouraged and assisted by British government officials. He established a number of hospitals and a network of schools throughout the Guntur region.

The Church Missionary Society (CMS), a mission society working with the Anglican Communion, began sending missionaries to India and established mission stations at Chennai (Madras) and Bengal, then in 1816 at Travancore. The CMS Mission to India expanded in the following years. The successors of the Protestant church missions are the Church of South India and the Church of North India.

Marathi Christians can be found in the areas of Ahmednagar, Solapur, Poona, and Aurangabad. They were converted through the efforts of the American Marathi Mission, The SPG Mission, and the Church Mission Society of Church of England in the early 18th century. British missionary William Carey was instrumental in translating the Bible into the Marathi language.

During the Bettiah Raj of Bihar, the ethnoreligious community of Bettiah Christians was established in India in the 17th century by Christian missionaries belonging to the Order of Friars Minor Capuchin, a Roman Catholic religious order. The Capuchins were personally invited to establish the Bettiah Christian Mission by Maharaja Dhurup Singh after the Italian Capuchin priest Joseph Mary Bernini treated his ill wife. Pope Benedict XIV, on 1 May 1742, approved the appointment of the Capuchins at the Bettiah Fort in a letter to Maharaja Dhurup Singh.

Many upper-class Bengalis converted to Christianity during the Bengali Renaissance under British Rule, including Krishna Mohan Banerjee, Michael Madhusudan Dutt, Anil Kumar Gain, and Gnanendramohan Tagore, Aurobindo Nath Mukherjee.

During the 19th century, several American Baptist missionaries evangelised in the northeastern parts of India. In 1876, Dr. E. W. Clark first went to live in a Naga village, four years after his Assamese helper, Godhula, baptised the first Naga converts. Rev. and Mrs. A.F. Merrill arrived in India in 1928 and worked in the southeast section of the Garo Hills. Rev. and Mrs. M.J. Chance spent most of the years between 1950 and 1956 at Golaghat working with the Naga and Garo tribes. Even today the heaviest concentrations of Christians in India continue to be in the Northeast among the Nagas, Khasis, Kukis, and Mizos.

Role in the Indian independence movement
Indian Christians were involved even at early stages of the nationalist movement in colonial India, both in the Indian National Congress and the wider Indian independence movement:

Indian Christian involvement in the early stages of the nationalist movement is also reflected in the high levels of participation in the activities of the Indian National Congress. During the period from its inception up until about 1892 all the evidence suggests that Indian Christians enthusiastically supported the National Congress and attended its annual meetings. For example, according to the official Congress report, there were 607 registered delegates at the Madras meeting of 1887; thirty-five were Christians and, of these, seven were Eurasians and fifteen were Indian Christians. Indian Christians alone made up 2.5 per cent of the total attendance, in spite of the fact that Christians accounted for less than 0.79 per cent of the population. The Indian Christian community was also well represented at the next four sessions of the Congress. The proportion of Indian Christian delegates remained very much higher than their proportion in the population, in spite of the fact that meetings were sometimes held in cities such as Allahabad and Nagpur, far removed from the main centres of Christian population.

The All India Conference of Indian Christians (AICIC) played an important role in the Indian independence movement, advocating for swaraj and opposing the partition of India. The AICIC also was opposed to separate electorates for Christians, believing that the faithful "should participate as common citizens in one common, national political system". The All India Conference of Indian Christians and the All India Catholic Union formed a working committee with M. Rahnasamy of Andhra University serving as President and B.L. Rallia Ram of Lahore serving as General Secretary; in its meeting on 16 April 1947 and 17 April 1947, the joint committee prepared a 13-point memorandum that was sent to the Constituent Assembly of India, which asked for religious freedom for both organisations and individuals; this came to be reflected in the Constitution of India.

Art and architecture 

There are a large number of items of artistic and architectural significance in the religious and domestic life of Indian Christians. Altars, statues, pulpits, crosses, bells and belfries of churches along with other household items are among the many things that form part of the sacred art of the Indian Christians.

The following artistic elements predate European Christianity and form an integral part of the religious art and architecture of the Saint Thomas Christians:
 The open-air granite (rock) cross called the Nasrani Sthamba
 Kodimaram (Dwajasthamba) or flag-staff made of Kerala's famed teak wood and often enclosed in copper hoses or paras
 The rock Deepasthamba or lampstand.

After the arrival of Vasco da Gama and more especially after the commencement of Portuguese rule in India, distinct patterns of Christian art developed within the areas of Portuguese influence, mostly along the coasts of the peninsula. The Portuguese commissioned monumental buildings and promoted architecture more than any other form of fine art. St. Francis Church, Kochi is the first European place of worship in India and incidentally also the place where Vasco da Gama was first buried. The Christian art of Goa reached its climax in church building, laying the foundations of Indian Baroque.

Indian Christian architecture during the British Raj has expanded into several different styles as a result of extensive church building in different parts of the country. The style that was most patronised is generally referred to as the British Regency style followed by Neo-Gothic and Gothic Revival architecture. Most Protestant cathedrals and churches in India conform to the Neo-Gothic and Gothic Revival architecture styles. The adaptation of European architectural elements to the tropical climate in India has resulted in the creation of the Indo-Gothic style. St. Paul's Cathedral, Kolkata is a typical example of this style. St. Mary's church, Chennai, the first Anglican Church built east of the Suez is one of the first examples of British colonial architecture in India. French and Danish influences on Christian art and architecture in India can be seen in their respective colonies.

Culture 

While Christians in India do not share one common culture, their cultures for the most part tend to be a blend of Indian, Syrian and European cultures. It differs from one region to another depending on several factors such as the prevailing rite and tradition and the extent of time for which Christianity has existed in those regions. The ancient Saint Thomas Christians of Kerala have a distinctively different culture when compared to Christians in other parts of the country. Historical ties with the Assyrian Church and assimilation of Indian culture have contributed to the development of a unique subculture among these traditional Syrian Christians or Nasranis of Kerala. The use of ornamental umbrellas for Christian religious festivities illustrates an example of the indigenous character of Kerala's Syriac Christianity. The Malankara Nasranis (Thomasine Christians) have a unique Syro-Malabarese culture which includes Christianised Jewish elements, along with some Hindu customs. 

As a result of the Christianisation of Goa by the Portuguese in the 16th century AD, Goan Catholics have adopted a more Western culture. The dance, song and cuisine of Goa has been greatly influenced by the Portuguese. The culture of Goan Catholics is a blend of Portuguese and Konkani cultures, with the former having a more dominant role because the Portuguese ruled Goa directly from 1510 to 1961. Mangalorean Catholics mainly migrants from the Konkan region to the Canara subregion of Carnataca, have developed a distinct Mangalorean Catholic culture. Christianity in other parts of India spread under the colonial regimes of the Dutch, Danish, French and most importantly the English from the early 17th century to the time of the Indian Independence in 1947. Christian culture in these colonial territories has been influenced by the religion and culture of their respective colonisers.

Contemporary Christian culture in India draws greatly from the English culture as a result of the influence and dominance of former British Indian rule, this is evident in the culture of Bombay East Indian Christians, who were the first subjects of English rule, in the erstwhile seven islands of Bombay and the adjacent areas of north Konkan. The Book of Common Prayer is a widely used supplement for worship in the two major Anglican Protestant denominations: Church of South India and Church of North India. Today Christians are considered to be one of the most progressive communities in India. Urban Christians are to a greater extent influenced by European traditions which is considered an advantage in the business environment of urban India; this is given as an explanation for the large number of Christian professionals in India's corporate sector. The Christian church runs thousands of educational institutions which have contributed to the strengthening of Christian culture in India.

Religion plays a significant role in the daily life of Indian Christians, India ranks 15 among countries with based on church attendance. Religious processions and carnivals are often celebrated by Indian Catholics. Cities with significant Christian populations celebrate patron saint days. As in other parts of the world, Christmas is the most important festival for Indian Christians. Anglo-Indian Christmas balls held in most major cities form a distinctive part of Indian Christian culture. Great Friday is a national holiday, All Souls Day is another holiday that is observed by most Christians in India. Most Protestant churches celebrate harvest festivals, usually in late October or early November. Easter and All Saints Day are also observed by many.

Christian weddings in India conform to the traditional white wedding. However it is not uncommon for Christian brides particularly in the south to wear a white sari instead of a white dress (gown). Prior to the 1960s, the dhothi was worn by South Canarese Christian men to Church weddings and other festivities and on certain occasions, it has almost completely been replaced by the black suit and tie nowadays.

Demographics 

The 2001 census of India recorded 24,080,016 Christians in the country, representing 2.34 per cent of the population. A vast majority of Indian Christians are Protestants, followed by Catholics and Oriental Orthodox etc.

Population by denomination 

In 2011, Pew reported 18,860,000 Protestants, 10,570,000 Catholics, 2,370,000 Oriental Orthodox and 50,000 other Christians in India. Other sources estimate the total number of Protestants throughout the country in several hundreds of denominations at 45 million (4.5 crore). Several sources estimate Catholic population in India at over 17 million (1.7 crore) The largest denomination is the Roman Catholic Church. Anglicans within the united Church of North India and Church of South India, constitute the second largest group at over 5 million (50 lakh).

The Saint Thomas Christians (Syro Malabar Church, Syro-Malankara Catholic Church, Malankara Orthodox Syrian Church, Jacobite Syrian Christian Church, Chaldean Syrian Church, CSI Syrian Christians, Mar Thoma Syrian Church, Pentecostal Syrian Christians, St. Thomas Evangelical Church and Malabar Independent Syrian Church) of Kerala form 18.75% of the Christians in India with 4.5 million of them. 310,000 were members of the Syro-Malankara Church and 4,000,000 of the Syro-Malabar Church. In January 1993, the Syro-Malabar Church and in February 2005, the Syro-Malankara Church were raised to the status of major archiepiscopal churches by Pope John Paul II. The Syro-Malabar Church is the second largest among the 23 Eastern Catholic Churches who accept the Pope as the visible head of the whole church. The Oriental Orthodox churches in India include the Malankara Orthodox Syrian Church with 1120,000 members, the Jacobite Syrian Christian Church with 800,000 members and the Malabar Independent Syrian Church with 30,000 members. The Malankara Mar Thoma Syrian Church is an Eastern Protestant denomination with 1,100,000 members.

Most Protestant denominations are represented in India, as a result of missionary activities throughout the country, such as the American Missionary Association, the Society for the Propagation of the Gospel Mission, the Church Mission Society of the Church of England and many other missions from Europe, America and Australia. In 1961, an evangelical wing of the Mar Thoma Church split and formed the St. Thomas Evangelical Church of India which has 35,000 members. There are about 1,267,786 Lutherans, 648,000 Methodists, 2,392,694 Baptists, and 823,456 Presbyterians in India.

The Open Brethren movement is also significantly represented in India. The main Brethren grouping is known as the Indian Brethren (with a following estimated at somewhere between 449,550 and 1,000,000), of which the Kerala Brethren are a significant subset. The closely related Assemblies Jehovah Shammah have around 310,000 adults and children in fellowship as of 2010. They are often considered part of the wider Brethren movement, although they were founded by an indigenous evangelist (Bakht Singh) and developed independently of the older Indian Brethren movement, which originated from missionary endeavours.

Pentecostalism is also a rapidly growing movement in India. The major Pentecostal churches in India are the Indian Pentecostal Church of God, the Assemblies of God, The Pentecostal Mission, the New Apostolic Church with 1,448,209 members, the New Life Fellowship Association with 480,000 members, the Manna Full Gospel Churches with 275,000 members, and the Evangelical Church of India with 250,000 members.

See main article: List of Christian denominations in India.

Population by region and group

Christianity is the predominant religion in the North East states of Nagaland, Mizoram Meghalaya, and Manipur, and has substantial populations in the states of Arunachal Pradesh, Assam, Tripura, Andhra Pradesh, Karnataka, Kerala, Tamil Nadu, Goa and Andaman Nicobar Islands.

A 2015 study estimates some 40,000 Christian believers from a Muslim background in the country, most of them belonging to Protestantism.

The census of India provides us with the official numbers for Christian population in India. The Indian census has been recorded every ten years since 1871 and has always included religion (along with population, race, rural distribution, and occupation, among others). The most recently published census is from 2011. Subsequent estimates from 2013, 2015, 2017 and 2019 are also considered reliable.

The native majority of Goa is Christian. According to the 1909 statistics in the Catholic Encyclopedia, the total Christian population in Portuguese controlled Goa was 293,628 out of a total population of 365,291 (80.33%). Due to emigration of natives (mostly Goan Catholics) from Goa to cosmopolitan cities in India (Mumbai, Bangalore, etc.) and to foreign countries, as well as mass migration of non-Christians to Goa from other states of India since the 20th century, the demographics of Goa have been severely altered. Less than 50% of Indian residents in Goa are ethnic Goans.

Conflicts and controversies

Hindu–Christian conflict 

The arrival of European colonialists brought about large-scale missionary activity in coastal India and North-East India. Cuncolim Massacre and the later sackings of Goa and Bombay-Bassein of those living in Portuguese India were the first known clashes.

During the 1998 attacks on Christians in southeastern Gujarat, the Human Rights Watch reported that from 25 December 1988 to 3 January 1999, at least 20 prayer halls were damaged or burnt down and Christian institutions were attacked in the Dangs district, and its surrounding districts and at least 25 villages had reported incidents of burning and damages to prayer halls all over Gujarat.

On 22 January 1999, an Australian missionary Graham Staines and his two sons were burnt to death by Dara Singh (Bajrang Dal) while sleeping in his station wagon at Manoharpur village in Keonjhar district in Odisha, India., In the annual human rights reports for 1999, the United States Department of State also criticized India for "increasing societal violence against Christians." The report on anti-Christian violence listed over 90 incidents of anti-Christian violence, ranging from damage of religious property to violence against Christians pilgrims.  The states of Rajasthan, Madhya Pradesh, Himachal Pradesh and Tamil Nadu passed laws placing restrictions on forced religious conversions as a result of communal tension between Christians and Hindus. The legislation passed in Tamil Nadu was later repealed.

In 2007, 19 churches were burned by Hindu right-wingers in Odisha following conflicts between Hindus and Christians regarding Christmas celebrations in the Kandhamal district.

In 2008, there was again violence against Christians, particularly in the state of Odisha, after the murder of Swami Lakshmanananda by Indian Maoists (communist insurgents), tensions flared between the two communities in 2008. Christians were blamed and attacked in Orissa with 38 killed and over 250 churches damaged while several thousands of Christians were displaced. Sitting BJP MLA Manoj Pradhan was sentenced to rigorous imprisonment for six years by a fast track court for a murder during the 2008 communal riots in Odisha's Kandhamal district. The 2008 anti-Christian attacks in Orissa spilled over and escalated into the 2008 attacks on Christians in southern Karnataka state. The acts of violence include arson and vandalism of churches, conversion of Christians to Hinduism by threats (force) of physical violence, distribution of threatening literature, burning of Bibles, raping of nuns, murder of Christian priests, and destruction of Christian schools, colleges and cemeteries. 

India is number 10 on Open Doors’ 2022 World Watch List, an annual ranking of the 50 countries where Christians face the most extreme persecution.

Muslim–Christian conflict 

In spite of the fact that there have been relatively fewer conflicts between Muslims and Christians in India in comparison to those between Muslims and Hindus, or Muslims and Sikhs, the relationship between Muslims and Christians has also been occasionally turbulent. With the advent of European colonialism in India throughout the 16th, 17th and 18th centuries, Christians were systematically persecuted in a few Muslim-ruled kingdoms in India.

Among the anti-Christian acts committed were those of Tippu Sultan, the ruler of the Kingdom of Mysore against the Mangalorean Catholic community from Mangalore (South Canara) district along the southwestern coast of India. Tippu was widely reputed to be anti-Christian. The captivity of Mangalorean Catholics at Seringapatam, which began on 24 February 1784 and ended on 4 May 1799, remains the most disconsolate memory in their history.

The Bakur Manuscript reports him as having said:
"All Musalmans should unite together, considering the annihilation of infidels as a sacred duty, and labour to the utmost of their power, to accomplish that subject."
Soon after the Treaty of Mangalore in 1784, Tippu gained control of Canara. He issued orders to seize the Christians in Canara, confiscate their estates, and deport them to Seringapatam, the capital of his empire, through the Jamalabad fort route. However, there were no priests among the captives. Together with Fr Miranda, all the 21 arrested priests were issued orders of expulsion to Goa, fined Rs 200,000, and threatened death by hanging if they ever returned.

Tippu ordered the destruction of 27 Catholic churches, all intricately carved with statues depicting various saints. Among them were Nossa Senhora de Rosario Milagres at Mangalore, Fr Miranda's Seminary at Monte Mariano, Jesu Marie Jose at Omzoor, the Chapel at Bolar, the Church of Merces at Ullal, Imaculata Conceiciao at Mulki, San Jose at Perar, Nossa Senhora dos Remedios at Kirem, Sao Lawrence at Karkal, Rosario at Barkur, and Immaculata Conceciao at Baidnur. All were razed to the ground, with the exception of the Church of Holy Cross at Hospet, owing to the friendly offices of the Chauta Raja of Moodbidri.

Historian William Dalrymple states that during the Indian Rebellion of 1857, Muslims sepoys were motivated primarily by resistance against a move (use of the Enfield Rifle-Musket) by the East India Company, which was perceived as an attempt to impose Christian law in Hindustan. For instance, when Mughal Emperor Bahadur Shah Zafar met the sepoys on 11 May 1857, he was told: "We have joined hands to protect our religion and our faith." They later stood in Chandni Chowk, the main square, and asked the people gathered there, "Brothers, are you with those of the faith?" Those British men and women who had previously converted to Islam such as the defectors, Sergeant-Major Gordon, and Abdullah Beg, a former Company soldier, were spared. On the contrary, foreign Christians such as Revd Midgeley John Jennings, as well as Indian converts to Christianity such as one of Zafar's personal physicians, Chaman Lal, were killed outright.

Dalrymple further points out that as late as 6 September, when calling the inhabitants of Delhi to rally against the upcoming British assault, Zafar issued a proclamation stating that this was a religious war being prosecuted on behalf of 'the faith', and that all Muslim and Hindu residents of the imperial city, or of the countryside were encouraged to stay true to their faith and creeds. As further evidence, he observes that the Urdu sources of the pre and post-rebellion periods usually refer to the British not as angrez (the English), goras (whites) or firangis (foreigners), but as kafir (infidels) and nasrani (Christians).

In modern times, Muslims in India who convert to Christianity are often subjected to harassment, intimidation, and attacks by Muslims. In Jammu and Kashmir, the only Indian state with a Muslim majority, a Christian convert and missionary named Bashir Tantray was killed, allegedly by militant Islamists in 2006. However, there are cases in which a Muslim will adopt crypto-Christianity, secretly declaring his/ her conversion. In effect, they are practising Christians, but are legally Muslims; thus the statistics of Indian Christians may not include all Muslim converts to Christianity.

List of Christian communities in India

Christian communities 

 Anglo-Indian people
 Bengali Christians
 Bettiah Christians
 Bombay East Indian Catholics
 Dalit Christians
 Goan Catholics
 Karwari Catholics
 Knanaya Christians
 Latin Catholics of Malabar
 Mangalorean Christians
 Marathi Christians
 Meitei Christians
 Protestants in India
 Punjabi Christians
 Reddy Catholics
 St Thomas Christians
 Tamil Christians
 Telugu Christian

Christianity by state 

 Christianity in Arunachal Pradesh
 Christianity in Assam
 Christianity in Bihar
 Christianity in Chhattisgarh
 Christianity in Delhi
 Christianity in Goa
 Christianity in Gujarat
 Christianity in Jharkhand
 Christianity in Karnataka
 Christianity in Kerala
 Christianity in Madhya Pradesh
 Christianity in Maharashtra
 Christianity in Manipur
 Christianity in Meghalaya
 Christianity in Mizoram
 Christianity in Nagaland
 Christianity in Odisha
 Christianity in Punjab
 Christianity in Tamil Nadu
 Christianity in Tripura
 Christianity in Uttar Pradesh
 Christianity in West Bengal

Notable Indian Christians

See also 

 Catholic Church in India
 Ancient Christianity in Indian subcontinent
 Saint Thomas Christian cross
 Anti-Christian violence in India
 Anti-Christian violence in Karnataka
 Caste system among Indian Christians
 List of notable Indian Christians
 List of cathedrals in India
 List of Saints from India
 List of basilicas in India
 List of Catholic missionaries in India
 List of Protestant missionaries in India
 Christian seminaries and theological colleges in India
 History of Pentecostalism in India
 Jesus in India
 History of the Jews in India
 Latin Catholics of Malabar

References

Citations

Bibliography 

 
 
 
 
 
 

 
 Dutta, Sutapa (2017). British Women Missionaries in Bengal, 1793–1861. UK: Anthem Press. 
 
 
 
 
 
 
 
 
 Latourette, Kenneth Scott. A history of expansion of christianity. vol 3. Three centuries of advance: AD 1500-AD 1800 (1939) pp 247–84.
 Latourette, Kenneth Scott. A history of expansion of Christianity. vol 6. The great century: in Northern Africa and Asia: AD 1800-AD 1914 (1944) pp 65–214.
 

 
 
 
 
 
 
 
 
 
 Oddie, Geoffrey A. "Christianity and social mobility in South India 1840–1920: A continuing debate." South Asia: Journal of South Asian Studies 19#1 (1996): 143–159.
 Oddie, Geoffrey A. "Indian Christians and National Identity, 1870–1947." Journal of religious history 25.3 (2001): 346–366.
 
 
 
 Schurhammer, Georg. Francis Xavier; His Life, His Times: India, 1541–1544 (Vol. 2. Jesuit Historical Institute, 1982).

Further reading 

 
 
 Goel, S.G. 2016. History of Hindu-Christian encounters, AD 304 to 1996.
 Hollister, John Norman. The Centenary of the Methodist Church in Southern Asia (Lucknow Publishing House, 1956). 
 Jain, Sandhya (2010). Evangelical intrusions: [Tripura, a case study]. New Delhi: Rupa & Co.
 Latourette, Kenneth S. Christianity In A Revolutionary Age A History Of Christianity In The Nineteenth And Twentieth Centuries Volume III The Nineteenth Century Outside Europe The Americas The Pacific Asia And Africa (1961) pp 400–415. online
 Latourette, Kenneth S. Christianity in a Revolutionary Age Vol. 5, The 20th Century outside Europe  (1962) pp 299–331.
 
 Madhya Pradesh (India)., & Niyogi, M. B. (1956). Vindicated by time: The Niyogi Committee report on Christian missionary activities. Nagpur: Government Printing, Madhya Pradesh.
 Moffett, Samuel Hugh. A History of Christianity in Asia, Vol. II, 1500–1900 (2005) . 
 The St. Thomas Christian Encyclopedia of India, Vol.I (India)1982, Vol.II (Kerala)1973, Vol.III(India)2010 Ed. George Menachery
 Indian Church History Classics"Vol.I (Nazranies)1998 Ed. George Menachery
 "History of the Syrian Nation and the Old Evangelical-Apostolic Church of the East" By George David Malech, Publisher: Gorgias Press
 S.M. Michael SVD, Dalit's Encounter with Christianity. A Case Study of Mahars in Maharashtra, ISPK – Ishvani Kendra: Delhi — Pune 2010,230 pp., .
 George Menachery, Ed., various publications incl. The St. Thomas Christian Encyclopaedia of India in 3 vols. and The Indian Church History Classics The Nazranies for some 1500 photos and art reproductions
 Panikkar, K. M. (1959). Asia and Western dominance. London: Allen & Unwin. 
 Panikkar, K. M. (1997). Malabar and the Portuguese: Being a history of the relations of the Portuguese with Malabar from 1500–1663. Bombay: D B Taraporevala.
 Pickett, J. Waskom. The Methodist Church in India. (1939).
 
 Shourie, Arun. (2006). Missionaries in India: Continuities, changes, dilemmas. New Delhi: Rupa.
 Thoburn, James M. The Christian conquest of India (1906) online
 This article includes material from the 1995 public domain Library of Congress Country Study on India.

External links 

 

Christianity in India
Religion in India
Christianity in Asia by country